Adelaide Pereira da Silva (São Paulo, July 5, 1928 - São Paulo, August 8, 2021) was a Brazilian pianist, composer and painter.

Biography
Adelaide Pereira da Silva was born in Sao Paulo. She started studying piano with her mother from an early age, and later with Nair de Souza. She became a well-accomplished pianist, when she took advanced interpretation classes with Professor  Hans Bruch. According to the renowned pianist Gilberto Tinetti, she was one of Bruch's most talented students (along with Isolde Bass - Bruch's wife - , Gilberto Tinetti himself, Rudolf Frisch, Elisa Capocchi, Arnaldo Antunes, Maria Elisa Figueiredo, and Roberto Delollio). In her thesis as well as in an article about Adelaide Pereira da Silva's compositions, Maria Mati Sakamoto quotes Gilberto Tinetti, who referred to Prof. Pereira da Silva's "exuberant sonority" as a pianist.

Initially, Adelaide Pereira da Silva studied composition with Dinorah de Carvalho and Osvaldo Lacerda. Later, she was Camargo Guarnieri's student, and became one of the major figures of his composition school, along with famous composers such as Osvaldo Lacerda himself, Almeida Prado, Sérgio Vasconcelos Correia, Nilson Lombardi, Lina Pires de Campos and Kilza Setti. She began working as a music teacher in 1960, and was also a professor at Santa Marcelina College and Belas Artes College. She composed a number of works based on Brazilian folk themes. Her knowledge and expertise in Brazilian folk music were acquired through studies developed under Rossini Tavares de Lima's guidance.

Professor Pereira da Silva was one of the founders of the  "Brazilian Pro Music Society" (Sociedade Pró-Música Brasileira).

As a composer, Adelaide Pereira da Silva was awarded many prizes, decorations, distinctions and honors:

- First prize by the Gazeta Burajiruforukurore Association composition competition with "Três canções sobre temas do folclore brasileiro" (Three songs based on Brazilian folk themes)

- Second prize  in Santos Composition Contest (Secretaria Municipal da Cidade de Santos) for the song "É tão pouco o que desejo" (based on a poem by renowned writer, Vicente de Carvalho).

- Medal - José Bonifácio de Andrada e Silva (awarded by Sociedade Brasileira de Heráldica - Brazilian Heraldry Society)

- Medal - Marechal Cândido Mariano da Silva Rondon (awarded by Sociedade Geográfica Brasileira - Brazilian Geographic Society)

- Medal - Legião Joana D'Arc (Sesquicentenário da Independência do Brasil - 150th Anniversary of Brazilian Independence)
- Medal - Ana Neri (awarded by Sociedade Brasileira de Educação e Integração - Brazilian Society for Education and Integration)

- Medal João Amos Comenius (awarded by Academia Brasileira de Letras - Brazilian Literary Academy)

- Decoration (The Great Rondon) - Silver Jubileum - Marechal Cândido Rondon and its founding president Agenor Couto de Magalhães

- Medal - Euclides da Cunha (Clube dos Estados - State Club)
- Spring Medal - Agenor Couto de Magalhães (awarded by Sociedade Geográfica Brasileira - Brazilian Geographic Society - Campaign for ecological protection)

- Medal - José Vieira Couto de Magalhães (awarded by Sociedade Geográfica Brasileira - Brazilian Geographic Society)

- Decoration - Carlos Gomes (Highest honor for Cultural Merit)

Works
Da Silva composed for orchestra, chamber ensemble, choir and solo instrument. Selected works include:
1962 Variations for piano (8 Variations)
1965 Suite No. 1 (Shindig, Fad, Polka, Waltz, Cateretê)
1965 Ponteio N. 1
1965 Ponteio N. 2
1965 Chôro N. Waltz 1
1965 Chôro N. Waltz 2
1966 Ponteio N. 3
1966 Ponteio N. 4
1966 Ponteio N. 5
1967 Suite N. 2 (Bent, Sieve, Chorinho, Baiao)
1970 Ponteio N. 6
1970 Ponteio N. 7
1970 Chôro N. Waltz 3
1970 Chôro N. Waltz 4
1970 Chôro N. Waltz 5
1970 Cantiga naive
1978 Recollection
1981 Echoes of Childhood
1993 Ponteio N. 8

Discography
Da Silva's works have been recorded and issued on CD, including:
Revelando o Brasil, Composições de Adelaide Pereira da Silva
Teclas Brasileiras
Brasileira: Piano Music by Brazilian Women Centaur Records
Mulheres Compositoras França - Brasil

References
4. Sakamoto, Maria Mati .  A compositora Adelaide Pereira da Silva e suas obras para piano . In: Anais do III ENCONTRO DE PESQUISA EM MUSICA- Título : A Música Brasileira na atualidade, Universidade Estadual de Maringá, UEM, 2006, Maringá- PR. Anais do III ENCONTRO DE PESQUISA EM MUSICA- UEM- Maringá -PR. Maringá- PR: Editora Massoni, 2006. v. II. p. 1-177.

5. Anspach, Silvia Simone PhD (2017) (Testimonial - Adelaide Pereira da Silva's niece, advanced piano student, and harmony and composition student)

1928 births
2021 deaths
People from São Paulo
20th-century classical composers
Women classical composers
Brazilian classical composers
Brazilian music educators
Women music educators
20th-century women composers